Hugo Distler was an Austrian figure skater who competed in men's singles. In 1928 he won a bronze at the world championships. He also earned a European silver in 1927 and a bronze in 1931.

Results

References

Austrian male single skaters
Year of birth missing
Year of death missing